Yuqiang (alternatively Yujiang 禺疆 or Yujing 禺京), in Chinese mythology is one of the descendants of Huang Di, the "Yellow Emperor". Yuqiang was also the god of the north sea and a wind god. His father was Yuhao, another sea god. Some accounts (Shanhaijing chapters 8 and 17) describe Yuqiang as having the body of a bird and the face of a human being, with a serpent mount for each foot that facilitated his travels.

See also
Chinese mythology

Notes

References
Yang, Lihui, et al. (2005). Handbook of Chinese Mythology. New York: Oxford University Press. 

Chinese gods